Agnė is a Lithuanian feminine given name. Individuals bearing the name Agnė include:
Agnė Bilotaitė (born 1982), Lithuanian politician
Agnė Čepelytė (born 1995), Lithuanian tennis player
Agnė Eggerth (born 1978), Lithuanian track and field sprint athlete
Agnė Grudytė (born 1986), Lithuanian actress and television presenter
Agnė Sereikaitė (born 1994), Lithuanian short track speed skater
Agnė Šerkšnienė (born 1988), Lithuanian sprinter
Agnė Šilinytė (born 1991), Lithuanian racing cyclist
Agnė Simonavičiūtė (born 1995), Lithuanian balloonist
Agnė Vaiciukevičiūtė (born 1989), Lithuanian politician

References 

Feminine given names
Lithuanian feminine given names